Jessica Claire Timberlake (née Biel ; born March 3, 1982) is an American actress. She has received various accolades, including a Young Artist Award, and nominations for a Primetime Emmy Award and two Golden Globe Awards.

Biel began her career as a vocalist appearing in musical productions until she was cast as Mary Camden in the family drama series 7th Heaven (1996–2006), in which she achieved recognition.

In 1997, Biel won the Young Artist Award for her role in the drama film Ulee's Gold. She received further recognition for her lead role as Erin Hardesty in the horror film The Texas Chainsaw Massacre (2003). Biel has since starred in such films as The Rules of Attraction (2002), Blade: Trinity (2004), Stealth (2005), The Illusionist (2006), I Now Pronounce You Chuck & Larry (2007), Valentine's Day (2010), The A-Team (2010), New Year's Eve (2011), Total Recall (2012), and Hitchcock (2012).

In 2017, Biel was the executive producer and star of the USA Network limited drama series The Sinner, for which she received nominations for a Golden Globe Award and a Primetime Emmy Award for Outstanding Lead Actress in a Limited Series or Movie.

Early life 
Jessica Claire Biel was born on March 3, 1982, in Ely, Minnesota, to Kimberly (née Conroe), a homemaker and spiritual healer, and Jonathan Biel, a business consultant and General Electric worker. Her paternal great-grandfather was the son of Hungarian-Jewish immigrants, which she discovered on the show Who Do You Think You Are?; she also has German, French, English, and Scandinavian ancestry. Her younger brother, Justin, launched and runs the eco-accessory line BARE. Biel's family moved frequently during her childhood, living in Texas, Connecticut, and Woodstock, Illinois, before finally settling in Boulder, Colorado. While growing up, Biel played soccer and trained as a level six gymnast. From 2000 to 2002, she attended Tufts University in Medford, Massachusetts.

Career

Beginnings (1991–2002) 
Biel initially trained to be a vocalist. At age nine, she appeared in several musical productions in her hometown, playing lead roles in productions such as The Sound of Music and Beauty and the Beast. At 11 she participated in a competition sponsored by the International Modeling and Talent Association in Los Angeles where she acquired an agent and professional talent manager. She began modeling for print advertisements and appeared in commercials for products such as Dulux Paint and Pringles. In her film debut, Biel played the character Regrettal, a lead role in the ambitious musical film It's a Digital World, produced and directed by Paul Greenberg. At age 14, after auditioning for several television pilots, Biel was cast as Mary Camden, the oldest daughter and second-oldest child in the family drama 7th Heaven.

Biel landed her first feature film role as Peter Fonda's granddaughter in the critically acclaimed drama Ulee's Gold, released in 1997. Her performance earned her a Young Artist Award. In spring 1998, during a break from filming 7th Heaven, she co-starred in I'll Be Home for Christmas with Jonathan Taylor Thomas as his character's love interest. When she was 17, she posed for a risque photo shoot that appeared in the March 2000 issue of Gear. Producers of 7th Heaven were outraged and brought legal action against Gear.  She later expressed regret for doing it, claiming she had been used and that she had been shown different pictures from those published. In 2001, Biel played the love interest of Freddie Prinze, Jr. in the baseball-themed film Summer Catch. In 2002, she starred as promiscuous college student Lara in the ensemble film The Rules of Attraction, an adaptation of the Bret Easton Ellis novel. The movie received mixed reviews, became a box-office hit, and has since gained a cult following.

Rise to prominence (2003–2012)

Biel was cast in her first top-billing role in The Texas Chainsaw Massacre. Although the film met with negative reviews, it was a commercial success, scoring the number-one spot in its opening week and going on to earn more than $80 million in the U.S. In 2003, Biel began work on the third installment of the Blade film series, Blade: Trinity. Despite negative reviews, Trinity was a box office hit, grossing $150 million worldwide. After finishing it in 2004, she headed to Australia to shoot the action-thriller Stealth. Biel also appeared in the 2004 film Cellular; played a supporting role, Ellen, in the romantic comedy Elizabethtown (2005); and starred in the indie film London. In 2005, Esquire named her the "Sexiest Woman Alive" in a six-part series with each month revealing a different body part and clue to the woman's identity.

In 2006, Biel played a turn-of-the-century duchess in the period piece The Illusionist, co-starring Edward Norton and Paul Giamatti. While her casting was met with a mixed response, her performance was ultimately praised. James Berardinelli of Reelviews called her the "film's real acting revelation", while Todd McCarthy of Variety wrote, "Handily employing a refined English accent where the others lay on a light Austrian veneer, Biel is entirely stunning enough to fight to the death over." Biel played an Iraq War veteran in the 2006 film Home of the Brave, a drama about soldiers struggling to readjust to society after facing the hardships of war. In Next Biel starred alongside Nicolas Cage and Julianne Moore. She appeared in the summer comedy I Now Pronounce You Chuck & Larry, co-starring Adam Sandler and Kevin James. In late 2007, Biel signed on to play a stripper in Powder Blue, alongside Forest Whitaker (who also produced the film), Ray Liotta and Patrick Swayze. In 2007, Stuff magazine's named her No. 1 on their "100 Sexiest Women".

At the start of 2008, Biel shot Easy Virtue, an adaptation of the play by Noël Coward. Like the play, the film is set in the 1920s and Biel plays young widow Larita, who impulsively marries John Whittaker in France and must face her disapproving in-laws on returning to England. The film premiered in September 2008 at the Toronto International Film Festival. Critics praised Biel for her performance, with Todd McCarthy of Variety saying Biel "more than kept up" with veterans Kristin Scott Thomas and Colin Firth and praising her "sparkling" performance. The Hollywood Reporter described her performance as "an irresistible force of nature — a kind, witty, supremely intelligent and beautiful woman who ... is capable of rejoinders that thoroughly undercut her opponent's withering criticism." Biel also performed two songs on the film's soundtrack, "Mad About the Boy" and "When the Going Gets Tough".

In 2009, Biel lent her voice to the animated science fiction film Planet 51. Biel performed the role of Sarah Brown with the Los Angeles Philharmonic in a fully staged concert production of Guys and Dolls during the 2009 season at the Hollywood Bowl. On the last night, she received a rousing standing ovation from 17,000 people. She subsequently landed a part in Lincoln Center Theater's two-week-long workshop of the musical version of the Pedro Almodóvar film Women on the Verge of a Nervous Breakdown, along with Salma Hayek.

In 2010, Biel starred in the large ensemble cast film Valentine's Day and in the A-Team, based on the television series as Capt. Charissa Sosa. In 2011, she appeared in New Year's Eve, directed by Valentine's Days Garry Marshall. In 2012, Biel starred in the remake of the 1990 science fiction movie Total Recall alongside Colin Farrell and Kate Beckinsale. She portrayed actress Vera Miles in the biographical film Hitchcock, based on Stephen Rebello's book Alfred Hitchcock and the Making of Psycho. She also appeared in Playing for Keeps with Gerard Butler.

Independent film route and move into producing (2013–present)

Biel starred in the thriller film Emanuel and the Truth About Fishes, which premiered at the Sundance Film Festival on January 18, 2013. In April 2008, Biel began working on the political satire Nailed, with Jake Gyllenhaal. The film centers around a woman who accidentally gets a nail lodged in her head and travels to Washington, D.C. to fight for better health care. In May 2009, Biel spoke about the film's production turmoil, saying: "That was definitely an experience, something I could not say no to. I am a huge David O. Russell fan. It's just heartbreaking that so many people put so much work into this particular project only to have it sit there, unfinished." The film was released on video on demand on February 10, 2015, and received largely negative reviews from critics.

In 2015, Biel starred in the independent drama Bleeding Heart, in which she plays a yoga instructor named May who meets her biological sister Shiva (Zosia Mamet), a sex worker, for the first time. The film premiered on April 17, 2015, at the Tribeca Film Festival, receiving mixed reviews, though Biel earned praise for her performance. Richard Lawson of Vanity Fair commented: "Though she's not given too much to work with in terms of character, Biel plays May with appealing nuance, creating a low-key, bliss-based Angeleno, all light and airy and gentle and poised, who discovers within herself an untapped hardness and anger and strength... when Biel has to conjure up more profound emotions, she proves adept, and surprisingly subtle." Clayton Davis of AwardsCircuit.com also praised her performance, writing, "With an internalized and very subtle performance, Biel excels in her ability to find the very motivation of May."

In 2016, Biel co-starred with Patrick Wilson (with whom she had worked on The A-Team) in the thriller A Kind of Murder, based on the novel The Blunderer by Patricia Highsmith. She voiced the character Vix in the animated film Spark, with Susan Sarandon and Hilary Swank, which was released in 2016. Biel also appeared in the drama The Book of Love, based on the book The Devil and the Deep Blue Sea, about an introverted architect (Jason Sudeikis) who loses his wife (Biel) and sets out to help a teenager named Millie (Maisie Williams). Biel also produced the project from its conception some years prior, and was directed by Bill Purple, who directed her in the short film Hole in the Paper Sky. The film was released in January 2017.

On August 2, 2017, Biel's eight-episode limited series murder mystery, The Sinner, debuted on USA Network. Biel is both executive producer and played the series' lead character Cora Tannetti. She stated that she moved into production so that she could develop projects with challenging and interesting roles rather than waiting for them to happen.

In October 2021, it was announced Biel would star and executive produce the true-crime drama Candy for Hulu.

Personal life 
In January 2007, Biel began dating singer-songwriter Justin Timberlake. They became engaged in December 2011 and married on October 19, 2012, at the Borgo Egnazia resort in Fasano, Italy. Biel and Timberlake have two sons together: one born in April 2015, and another born in July 2020.

Alongside anti-vaccination conspiracy theorist Robert F. Kennedy Jr., Biel publicly lobbied in June 2019 against California's vaccination bill that would limit medical exemptions from vaccinations without approval from a state public health officer.

Charitable causes 
On July 18, 2006, Biel participated in a charity auction to raise medical funds for teen Molly Bloom, who was injured in a limousine accident. "I promise I'm a cheap date", Biel quipped in a pre-recorded video. John Schiffner of Fergus Falls, Minnesota, successfully bid $30,000 to have lunch with Biel. Biel and Schiffner lunched at The Palm restaurant in Denver, Colorado, on August 18, 2006. In early 2007, Biel co-founded the Make the Difference Network with her father and another business partner, Kent McBride. In 2010, Biel climbed to the summit of Mount Kilimanjaro with members of the United Nations Foundation to raise awareness of the global water crisis. That same year Biel earned a nomination for a Do Something Award. Biel teamed with nonprofit health care organization WomanCare Global to develop content that will provide girls with sex education.

Filmography

Film

Television

Music videos

Awards and nominations

References

External links 

 
 

1982 births
Living people
20th-century American actresses
21st-century American actresses
Actresses from Boulder, Colorado
Actresses from Minnesota
American child actresses
American film actresses
American musical theatre actresses
American voice actresses
American people of English descent
American people of French descent
American people of Hungarian-Jewish descent
American people of Irish descent
American people of Danish descent
American people of Swiss-German descent
American people of Scottish descent
American people of Welsh descent
American people of Swedish descent
American television actresses
Female models from Colorado
Female models from Minnesota
People from Ely, Minnesota
Tufts University alumni